Edmundoa ambigua is a plant species in the genus Edmundoa. This species is endemic to Brazil.

References

ambigua
Flora of Brazil